Peter Frederick Bronfman, OC (October 2, 1929 – December 1, 1996) was a Canadian businessman and entrepreneur, born in Montreal, and member of the Toronto branch of Canada's wealthy Bronfman family. He attended Selwyn House School in Montreal and the elite Lawrenceville School in New Jersey, one of the oldest prep schools in America, and received his bachelor's degree from Yale University in 1952.

Career
Peter Frederick Bronfman was born in Montreal in 1929, a son of Allan Bronfman and nephew of Samuel Bronfman, the founder of the Seagram Company. He attended the Lawrenceville School in Lawrenceville, N.J., and received a bachelor's degree from Yale University in 1952. Bronfman was the co-founder (with his brother, Edward Bronfman) of Edper Investments, their private holding company that at its peak was estimated to control $100 billion in assets, including some of the largest corporations in Canada.  He and his brother also owned the Montreal Canadiens from 1971 to 1978, winning four Stanley Cups with the team 1973, 1976, 1977, 1978.  Bronfman also owned Labatt Brewing Company which owned the Toronto Blue Jays when they won their World Series titles in 1992 and 1993.

Personal life and legacy
On November 14, 1996, Bronfman was made an Officer of the Order of Canada. It was presented posthumously in 1997.

Bronfman died of cancer on December 1, 1996. He was survived by his third wife, Lynda Hamilton Bronfman; and three children, Linda Bronfman, Brenda Bronfman, and Bruce Bronfman.

York University's Schulich School of Business in Toronto, Canada has its business library named after him.

The G. Raymond Chang School of Continuing Education at Toronto Metropolitan University houses the Peter Bronfman Learning Centre, which is located on the seventh floor of the Heaslip House.

References

Further reading
 
 
 
 
 Peter C. Newman, "Peter Bronfman: The gentle, lonely tycoon", Maclean's magazine (December 16, 1996)
 Susan Gittins, Behind Closed Doors: The Rise and Fall of Canada's Edper Bronfman and Reichman Empires (1995)
 Patricia Best and Ann Shortell, The Brass Ring: Power, Influence and the Brascan Empire (1988)

External links
 The Bronfman Family on the Canadian Encyclopedia

1928 births
1996 deaths
20th-century Canadian businesspeople
Peter Bronfman
Jewish Canadian philanthropists
Officers of the Order of Canada
Businesspeople from Montreal
Yale University alumni
Canadian company founders
Canadian people of Russian-Jewish descent
Canadian real estate businesspeople
Labatt Brewing Company
Bishop's College School alumni
Deaths from cancer in Ontario